Üzeyir is a Turkish given name transliterated from Ezra. Notable people with the name include:

Üzeyir Garih (1929–2001), Turkish Jewish businessman
Uzeyir Hajibeyov (1885–1948), Azerbaijani and Soviet composer

Turkish masculine given names